Vyacheslav Ivanovich Klokov (born 1959) is a retired Russian heavyweight weightlifter. He won the world and European titles in 1983, placing second in 1981 and 1982. Between 1980 and 1983 he set seven ratified world records. After retiring from competitions he headed the Russian Weightlifting Federation and served as vice-president of the European Weightlifting Federation. His son Dmitry Klokov became an Olympic heavyweight weightlifter.

References

1959 births
Living people
Soviet male weightlifters
World Weightlifting Championships medalists